The Last Innocent Man is a 1987 American made-for-television thriller film directed by Roger Spottiswoode that aired on HBO. The teleplay by Dan Bronson is based on the novel by Phillip M. Margolin.

Plot
A criminal defense attorney is seduced by a beautiful woman and reluctantly takes on the defense of her estranged husband who is charged with murder, but finds his career threatened because of the circumstances.

Cast

Production
Filming took place in Portland, Oregon.

Broadcast
It was first broadcast on HBO on April 19, 1987.

References

External links
 

1987 thriller films
1987 television films
1987 films
Films shot in Oregon
Films based on American novels
HBO Films films
Films directed by Roger Spottiswoode
Films scored by Brad Fiedel
1980s English-language films